Djavan Santos (born October 30, 1990), better known by his stage name D33J, is an American record producer based in Los Angeles, California. He is a member of the Wedidit collective. He has collaborated with Tory Lanez and Lil Yachty.

Early life
Djavan Santos was born and raised in Los Angeles, California. He studied guitar and electronic music at Alexander Hamilton High School.

Career
D33J remixed Kid Smpl's "Pulse" off of Escape Pod. In October 2012, it was announced that he got signed to the Anticon label. His first extended play (EP), Tide Songs, was re-released on the label in early 2013. He released the second EP, Gravel, later that year. In 2017, D33J released his debut studio album, Death Valley Oasis. It included guest appearances from Deradoorian, Baths, Corbin, and Shlohmo.

Discography

Studio albums
 Death Valley Oasis (2017)

Mixtapes
 Infinity 33 (2018)

EPs
 Tide Songs (2011)
 Gravel (2013)
 Gravel Remixed (2015)

Guest appearances
 Shlohmo - "Apathy" from Dark Red (2015)
 Joji - "Why Am I Still in LA" from Ballads 1 (2018)
 ASAP Nast - "Designer Boi" (2020)

Productions

 Tory Lanez - "Honda Civic" from Cruel Intentions (2015)
 Tory Lanez - "Honda Civic" from I Told You  (2016)
 Lil Yachty - "IDK" from Summer Songs 2 (2016)
 Lil Yachty - "Like a Star" from Teenage Emotions (2017)
 Corbin - Mourn (2017)
 Joji - "Why Am I Still in LA" from Ballads 1 (2018)
 Bad Gyal – Worldwide Angel (2018)

Remixes
 Kid Smpl - "Pulse (D33J Remix)" from Escape Pod (2012)
 El Ten Eleven - "Lullaby (D33J Remix)" from Transitions Remixed (2013)

References

External links
 D33J at Anticon
 

Living people
1990 births
Anticon artists
American electronic musicians
Record producers from California
Musicians from Los Angeles